Toni Mihajlovski (born 1 July 1967) is a Macedonian theater, motion picture and television actor, stand up comedian, presenter and showman.

Life
Mihajlovski was born in Kumanovo, Yugoslavia on the 1st of July, 1967. After completing The Faculty of Arts in Skopje at the Ss. Cyril and Methodius University in Skopje he became a member of the drama section in the Macedonian National Theater in 1994. During the 5th annual "JoakimInterFest" in 2010 which took place in Kragujevac, Serbia, he received the award for best actor

Filmography
 1996: Selfdestruction  (supporting role)
 1997: Gypsy Magic (leading role)
 1998: Cabaret Balkan (leading role)
 1998: Goodbye, 20th Century! (leading role)
 2000: Tunel (supporting role)
 2003: One of the faces of death (supporting role)
 2003: Seven stories about love and endings (supporting role)
 2004: Bal-Can-Can (leading role)
 2004: How I killed a Saint (supporting role)
 2011: Punk's Not Dead (leading role)
 2011: Parade (supporting role)
 2012: The Third Half (leading role)
 2014: Monument to Michael Jackson (leading role)
 2014: To the hilt (leading role)
 2015: We Will Be the World Champions (supporting role)

References

1967 births
Living people
People from Kumanovo
Macedonian stand-up comedians
Macedonian male film actors
Macedonian male stage actors
Macedonian male television actors